The 2025 U Sports Women's Volleyball Championship is scheduled to be held March 14–16, 2025, in Winnipeg, Manitoba, to determine a national champion for the 2024–25 U Sports women's volleyball season.

Host
The tournament is scheduled to be hosted by the University of Manitoba at the Investors Group Athletic Centre on the school's campus. This would be the third time that Manitoba has hosted the tournament with the most recent occurring in 2001.

Scheduled teams
Canada West Representative
OUA Representative
RSEQ Representative
AUS Representative
Host (Manitoba Bisons)
Three additional berths

Championship bracket

Consolation bracket

References

External links 
 Tournament Web Site

U Sports volleyball
2025 in women's volleyball
University of Manitoba